Pigni is a surname. Notable people with this surname include:

 Paola Pigni (1945–2021), Italian runner
 Renzo Pigni (1925–2019), Italian politician

Italian-language surnames